Jacob Gade Kollegiet is a hall of residence for students at the Royal Danish Academy of Music located at Kronprinsessegade 44 in central Copenhagen, Denmark. The building is owned by Jacob Gades Legat, a foundation established by Jacob Gade. The building was listed on the Danish registry of protected buildings and places in 1945.

History
Kronprinsessegade 44 was built in 1804-1805 by master timber Peder Christian Sabroe (c.1742-????). The building was heightened with one floor in 1846.

Den Indre B's Kristelige sociale Arbejde operated a combined daycare and [[After-school activity
|after school programme]] (fritidshjem) in the building from around 1900. The building was adapted in 1927-1928.

In 1972, Jacob Gades Legat purchased the building. It was subsequently converted into a hall of residence for students at the Royal Danish Academy of Music. The last regular tenants moved out in 2009. The building was refurbished in 2012-14 with assistance from Erik Møller Arkitekter.

Today
The complex comprises 21 apartments. Several students share each apartment.

References

External links
 Official website

University and college residential buildings in Copenhagen
Listed residential buildings in Copenhagen
Residential buildings completed in 1805
1805 establishments in Denmark
1972 establishments in Denmark